is a university museum affiliated with the University of the Ryukyus in Nishihara, Okinawa Prefecture, Japan. Of the collection of 160,000 items, which includes zoological type specimens and cultural artefacts such as the remains of the sundial from Shuri Castle and examples of warazan, some fifteen hundred are included in the permanent exhibition.

History
The original Fūjukan was donated to the university in 1967, while it was still located on the former Shuri campus. In 1983, with the relocation of the University to the Senbaru campus, planning began for a new specimen repository. Construction of the new facility was completed in March 1985 and, after the transfer in of the collection, the new Fūjukan opened in September of the same year. In 2015, the Fūjukan was elevated to the status of University Museum.

Publications
 Fauna Ryukyuana

See also
 Okinawa Prefectural Museum

References

External links
 Ryukyu University Museum (Fūjukan)

Nishihara, Okinawa
Museums in Okinawa Prefecture
Museums established in 2015
2015 establishments in Japan
University museums in Japan